Marco Tulio Aceituno Mejia (born 28 December 2003) is a Honduran professional footballer who plays as a winger for Real España.

Career statistics

Club

Honours
Individual
CONCACAF U-20 Championship Best XI: 2022

References

Living people
2003 births
Honduran footballers
Association football forwards
Liga Nacional de Fútbol Profesional de Honduras players
Real C.D. España players
Honduras under-20 international footballers